The Mosque of Cristo de la Luz is a Catholic chapel and former mosque in Toledo, Spain. It is the one of the ten that existed in the city during the Moorish period. The edifice was then known as Mezquita Bab-al-Mardum, deriving its name from the city gate Bab al-Mardum. It is located near the Puerta del Sol, in an area of the city once called Medina where wealthy Muslims used to live.

History 
Built in 999 in Toledo, this building is a rarity in that it is in much the same state as it was when it was originally built. The original patron was Ahmad Ibn Hadidi. The Arabic inscription in Kufic on the building states that Musa Ibn Ali built it. The inscription is written with brick in Kufic script on the south-west façade reveals these details of the mosque's foundation: Legend has it that a shaft of light guided the king to a figurine of the crucified Christ that had been hidden for centuries. He left his shield there with the inscription, "This is the shield which the King Alfonso VI left in this chapel when he conquered Toledo, and the first mass was held here". The legend says that King Alfonso VI arrived in Toledo after his victory of capturing the city in 1085 when his horse fell in front of this chapel. The story tells that candle has been continuously burning in the cracks of the stone wall throughout the entire rule of Muslims and when the King further explored the place he discovered a crucifix. The crucifix was moved to the Santa Cruz Museum located in the same city. It is said that the first mass after the King’s victory of Toledo was held here.

In 1186, Alfonso VIII gave the building to the Knights of the Order of St John, who established it as the Chapel of the Holy Cross (Ermita de la Santa Cruz). It was at this time that the mosque was renamed and the apse was added.

Architecture

The building is a small square structure, measuring roughly 8 m × 8 m, with a later semi-circular apse added to on the east side. It is built mostly from brick and stone. Four columns capped with capitals support horseshoe arches that divide the interior into nine compartments or bays. Covering each of these bays is a vault that has a distinctive design that is unique unto itself. Each vault employs the use of ribs to create the designs that make them unique. Each of them follows the basic ideas of Islamic design. The ribs typically do not cross in the center, an idea that is seen in many Muslim designs. Some of the designs are more rectilinear while others embrace the curved forms of the vault more prominently. Within each one is a piece of their culture and tradition of building. The ribs in the domes are related to subsequent early Gothic architecture. The cupola of the central vault is higher than the other ones and its ribs form a star shape. The columns and the capitals are spolia taken from previous buildings. Three of the capitals are of Visigothic origin.

The construction techniques are a reflection of both the local building tradition as well as the influence from the caliphate in Córdoba. The influence of the caliphate can be seen in the brickwork on the façade of the building which resembles those seen at the Cathedral–Mosque of Córdoba. Originally the eastern wall was a continuous stretch of brick and served as the qibla wall for the mosque. Also located along this side would have been a mihrab used for worship. The former mihrab consisted of a niche inside a square section which was slightly larger than the other nine bays of the mosque. 

The other three facades are articulated by three-bay arcades. All are similar, but individual in their decoration. The western wall which served as the main entrance is unique in how the arcade is articulated. This façade has a lobed arch, horseshoe arch, and a wider version of a horseshoe arch. Brickwork arches provide the decoration for the façade which are influenced by the architecture in Córdoba. 

In later years a Mudéjar-style semi-circular apse was added. In the process of the addition the qibla wall and mihrab were lost. The use of the Mudéjar style provided a smooth transition from the original structure to the apse, as the addition uses the same style of decoration and materials as the original. The continuation of the arch motif is an important link between the two sections of the building.

There is a small garden next to the building with a small fountain in the center.

See also
Mezquita de las Tornerias
Church of San Sebastián, Toledo
History of medieval Arabic and Western European domes

Notes and references

King, G., “The Mosque Bab Mardum in Toledo and the Influences Acting Upon It” in: Art and Archaeology Research Papers, 2, 1972, pp. 29–40.

External links

Description of the Mosque of Cristo de la Luz in toledomonumental.com
Museum With No Frontiers  (retrieved on December 4, 2008)
Page at ArteHistoria  (retrieved December 3, 2008)
Photos of Bab-Mardun on Oronoz.com  (retrieved on December 3, 2008)
 Bab Mardum Mosque - An inspiration for Gothic?

Buildings and structures in Toledo, Spain
Former mosques in Spain
10th-century mosques
Moorish architecture in Spain
Tourist attractions in Toledo, Spain
Architecture of the Caliphate of Córdoba